Espagne was an  ocean liner which was built in 1909–10 for Compagnie Générale Transatlantique. She served as a troopship during World War I and was in service until 1932, and was scrapped in 1934.

Design
Espagne was ordered from Chantiers & Ateliers de Provence, Port de Bouc, Bouches-du-Rhône on 29 May 1908 as Yard No.30 for Compagnie Générale Transatlantique. The ship was powered by two 4-cylinder triple expansion steam engines. The engines had cylinders of 33 inches (85 cm), 53  inches (137 cm) and two of 66 inches (170 cm) diameter by  stroke. The engine was built by Chantiers & Ateliers de Provence.

History
Espagne was the only transatlantic ocean liner built by Chantiers & Ateliers de Provence. Launched on 19 December 1909, she was completed in October 1910. Her port of registry was Le Havre and the Code Letters OGPR were allocated.

Espagne served on routes to Central America and the West Indies. In September 1911, she developed a leak on arrival at Santander, Spain and was taken to Le Havre for repairs. In mid-1912, she was used on the Le Havre – New York route. Following the Tampico Affair, Espagne transported 100 refugees from Puerto Mexico to Veracruz, Mexico.

Espagne returned to the Le Havre – New York route from mid-1914. She transferred to the Bordeaux – New York route in 1915. In February 1916, American passengers booked to travel on Espagne received anonymous letters telling them not to. From 1916–20, she served as a troopship. Espagne returned to the Central American and Caribbean routes in 1920. In 1926, a decree was issued in Mexico that all priests had to be born there. A number of Spanish priests were arrested and deported. Fourteen of them travelled on Espagne from Veracruz to a Spanish port in February 1926. On 20 August 1926, she struck a rock off A Coruña, Spain and damaged one of her propellers. Espagne served until  June 1932, when she was laid up. She was scrapped at Saint-Nazaire, Loire-Atlantique in May 1934, by the company M. Glotz.

References

External links
 A short video dedicated to the Espagne with numerous photographs

1909 ships
Ships built in France
Passenger ships of France
Merchant ships of France
World War I merchant ships of France
Troop ships of France
Ships of the Compagnie Générale Transatlantique
Maritime incidents in 1926